"Charlotte's Web" is a song written by Snuff Garrett, Cliff Crofford and John Durrill, and recorded by American country music group The Statler Brothers.  It was released in July 1980 as the first single from the album 10th Anniversary.  The song reached #5 on the Billboard Hot Country Singles & Tracks chart. It also appeared on the soundtrack to Smokey and the Bandit II.

Chart performance

References

1980 singles
The Statler Brothers songs
Songs written by Snuff Garrett
Song recordings produced by Jerry Kennedy
Mercury Records singles
1980 songs
Smokey and the Bandit